= Layhigh, Ohio =

Unincorporated community in Ohio, U.S.

Coordinates: 39°21′42″N 84°41′46″W

Layhigh is an unincorporated community in Butler County, in the U.S. state of Ohio.

The community was so named on account of its elevation of 910 feet (280 m) above sea level.
